Eitzen Group was a shipping and investment corporation based in Oslo, Norway. The parent company was Eitzen Holding AS and was entirely owned by the Eitzen family which owns Eitzen Invest and 53.7% of Camillo Eitzen & Co. The investment company owned a portfolio of real estate and other investments, including Hydranor and a major share of Norse Energy as well as in the fishing industry.

History
The company was founded in 1883 as Camillo Eitzen by shipmaster Camillo Eitzen. In 1894 Captain Henri F. Tschudi became a partner and the company changed its name to Camillo Eitzen & Co. The company bought its first steam ship a year later S/S UTO. In 1936 the company changed its name to Tschudi & Eitzen. It entered the ore-bulk-oil carrier segment in 1967. In 1990 the company bought the Danish company Skou International and entering the bulk segment. In 1997 it bought EAC Shipping and in 2001 KIL Shipping and with it entered the tanker sector. In 2004 the company changed name to Camillo Eitzen & Co and listed on the Oslo Stock Exchange when Tschudi & Eitzen merged and the separate company Eitzen Holding owned by the Eitzen family became established. The same year Navale Française was purchased along with Bergesen's Igloo gas fleet. In 2006 both Eitzen Chemical and Eitzen Maritime Services were created and listed on the Oslo Stock Exchange.

Demise
In 2011, Axel C. Eitzen stated that Eitzen Holding had been heavily indebted, and that he left the company and its assets to the banks. The company among others faced a  debt to the bank Nordea, and was liquidated in 2012.

References

 
Shipping companies of Norway
Holding companies of Norway
Real estate companies of Norway
Companies based in Oslo
Real estate companies established in 1883
Companies disestablished in 2012
2012 disestablishments in Norway
Norwegian companies established in 1883